Carol McFarlane (born September 27, 1950) is a Minnesota politician and former member of the Minnesota House of Representatives representing District 53B, which included all or portions of North Oaks, White Bear Lake, and White Bear Township in northeastern Ramsey County, which is part of the Twin Cities metropolitan area. A Republican, she is also a small business owner.

McFarlane was first elected in 2006, and was re-elected in 2008 and 2010. She served as an assistant minority leader. She was a member of the House's K-12 Education Policy and Oversight Committee, on which she was the ranking minority party member, and also served on the Finance subcommittees for the Higher Education and Workforce Development Finance and Policy Division, the Housing Finance and Policy and Public Health Finance Division, the K-12 Education Finance Division, and the Transportation and Transit Policy and Oversight Division.

McFarlane graduated from White Bear Lake High School, then went on to Lakewood State Junior College, now called Century College, also in White Bear Lake, earning her A.A. degree. She is an owner and board member of Venburg Tire Company in Maplewood.

Active in her local community, McFarlane served on the White Bear Lake School Board from 2000 to 2006, as a member of the White Bear Lake Area Educational Foundation, as founding president of the White Bear Lake Area Alumni Association, as former president and board member of the 916 Foundation, and as a co-chair of the northeast chapter of MICAH, an affordable housing resource organization.

References

External links

 Rep. McFarlane Web Page
 Minnesota Public Radio Votetracker: Rep. Carol McFarlane
 Project Votesmart - Rep. Carol McFarlane Profile
 Carol McFarlane Campaign Web Site

Living people
1950 births
People from White Bear Lake, Minnesota
Republican Party members of the Minnesota House of Representatives
Women state legislators in Minnesota
21st-century American politicians
21st-century American women politicians